Tvedestrand is a town and the administrative centre of Tvedestrand municipality in Agder county, Norway. The town is located at the northern end of the Tvedestrandfjorden at the intersection of the Norwegian County Road 411 and Norwegian County Road 410. The Tvedestrand Church is located in the central part of the town.

History
Tvedestrand had been a small coastal village with a small amount of industry when it became the main port of departure for the materials from the nearby Næs Jernverk (iron works) starting in 1738. In 1836, the port was declared to be a ladested and then on 1 January 1838, it became a town municipality under the new civil municipality law (see formannskapsdistrikt law). The town status was granted to allow it a special license to export timber and iron from the harbour. On 1 January 1858, there was a boundary adjustment that added 70 more residents to the town of Tvedestrand from the neighboring rural municipality of Holt.

During the 1960s, there were many municipal mergers across Norway due to the work of the Schei Committee. On 1 January 1960, the neighboring municipalities of Dypvåg (population: 1,805) and Holt (population: 3,759) were merged with the town of Tvedestrand (population: 868) to form a new municipality called Tvedestrand. Due to the merger, however, Tvedestrand lost its town status. A new law was passed in 1996 that allowed municipalities to declare urban areas as towns once again. In 1997, the municipality approved the town status for the former town of Tvedestrand.

Name

Media gallery

See also
List of towns and cities in Norway

References

Tvedestrand
Cities and towns in Norway
Port cities and towns in Norway
Populated places in Agder
1997 establishments in Norway